Berriedale is a suburb in the northern suburbs of Hobart, capital of Tasmania, Australia. It is in the local government area of City of Glenorchy.  The suburb is situated between the suburbs of Chigwell and Rosetta.  There are no educational institutions within Berriedale, however there are primary schools in both neighbouring suburbs and a high school in Rosetta.  The suburb is split in two (northeast/southwest) by the Brooker Highway; it is, therefore, not uncommon to hear the terms East Berriedale and  West Berriedale, with the former half following the edge of the Derwent River and the latter extending into the rural Derwent Valley Region.

Population
According to the 2021 census of Population, there were 2,905 people in Berriedale.
 Aboriginal and Torres Strait Islander people made up 5.2% of the population. 
 80.0% of people were born in Australia and 83.8% of people only spoke English at home.
 The most common responses for religion were No Religion 43.2%, Anglican 18.2% and Catholic 16.8%.

Recreation areas
Alroy Court Reserve
Berriedale Caravan Park
Chandos Drive Reserve
International Peace Forest
Southern City BMX track

Retail facilities
Granada Tavern
Innkeeper Bottleshop
Tote
Berriedale Caravan Park
Moorilla Estate and Museum of Old and New Art (MONA)
 Colonial Accommodation @ Undine Bed and Breakfast
Berriedale Road general store
Berriedale Community Hall
United service station
Liberty Independent service station

References